Greenmount Beach is a beach located in Coolangatta on Queensland's Gold Coast in Australia.

Greenmount Point is a coastal headland separating the Coolangatta stretch of beach to the west and Rainbow Bay to the east.

Greenmount Beach is home to Tweed Heads & Coolangatta Surf Life Saving Club and Greenmount Beach Surf Club.

The beach is protected by shark nets. In September 2020 a man was fatally bitten by a shark while surfing in the water.

History 
The Greenmount Guest House was opened by Patrick J Fagan in 1905. He named it after his birthplace in County Meath, Ireland. The beach was named after the guest house.

Notes

Geography of Gold Coast, Queensland
Surfing locations in Queensland
Beaches of Queensland
Coolangatta